A backpack—also called  knapsack, schoolbag, rucksack, rucksac, pack, sackpack, booksack, bookbag or backsack—is, in its simplest frameless form, a fabric sack carried on one's back and secured with two straps that go over the shoulders, but it can have an external frame, internal frame, and there are bodypacks.

Backpacks are commonly used by hikers and students, and are often preferred to handbags for carrying heavy loads or carrying any sort of equipment, because of the limited capacity to carry heavy weights for long periods of time in the hands.

This improves the potential to carry heavy loads, as the hips are stronger than the shoulders, and also increases agility and balance, since the load rides nearer the wearer's own center of mass.

Terminology
The word backpack was coined in the United States in the 1910s. Moneybag and packsack were used prior, and now occur mainly as regionalisms.

The word rucksack is a German loanword mainly used in the UK, US and in other Western military forces. In Middle High German ruck(e) means "back" (dorsum), which led to the Upper German word ruggsack. In modern German the word "der Rucksack" is commonly used. The name rucksack is cognate with the Danish rygsæk, Norwegian ryggsekk, Dutch rugzak, Afrikaans rugsak, Swedish ryggsäck, and Russian рюкзак (rjukzak).

The word knapsack was the usual name for a rucksack or backpack up until the middle of the 20th century. This is commonly used in Canada.

Alternative names include haversack from the German Hafersack meaning "oat sack" (which more properly describes a small cloth bag on a strap worn over one shoulder and originally referred to the bag of oats carried as horse fodder), Kraxe (a German rucksack with a rigid framework), and bergen (a large load-carrying rucksack, from a design issued by the British Army during the Second World War). In fact, Britons used to call Alpine-style backpacks "Bergen rucksacks", maybe from the name of their creator, Norwegian Ole F. Bergan, combined with the name of the Norwegian city of Bergen.

Backpacks can often simply be referred to as "packs", especially in outdoors contexts; though sometimes ambiguous compared to other bags such as saddlebags and duffel bags, context is generally sufficient for identification. They are also used in recreational activities, and have long since been used to carry sports equipment and other materials.

Long before its various terminologies began appearing in print, evidence of early backpacks was scarce. A contender for the earliest was found within the mummified remains of Ötzi in 3300BC.

Designs

Backpacks in general fall into one of four categories: frameless, external frame, internal frame, and bodypack. A pack frame, when present, serves to support the pack and distribute the weight of its contents across the body more appropriately, by transferring much of the weight to the hips and legs. Most of the weight is therefore taken off the shoulders, reducing the chance of injury from shoulder strap pressure (many backpacks equipped solely with shoulder straps can affect the posture of a person carrying more than 14 kg (30 lbs)), as well as being less restrictive of the upper body range of motion. Most backpacks are capable of being closed with either a buckle mechanism, a zipper, or a dry-bag type closure, though a few models use a drawstring fitted with a cord lock for the main compartment.

A bodypack is a backpack fitted with one or more pockets that are suspended on the wearer's chest and loaded in such a way that the load in the front and the load in the back are close to equal. The majority of the load in a bodypack is carried by the hips. The ideal load carrying system should not disturb the wearer's natural posture, balance and maneuverability. The load must be dispersed onto the skeletal structure in an even manner, and should not produce unbalanced forces on the body.

Frameless
The simplest backpack design is a bag attached to a set of shoulder straps. Such packs are used for general transportation of goods, and have variable capacity. The simplest designs consist of one main pocket. This may be combined with webbing or cordage straps, while more sophisticated models add extra pockets, waist straps, chest straps, padded shoulder straps, padded backs, and sometimes reflective materials for added safety at night. These packs are generally produced inexpensively.

Some outdoor packs, particularly those sold for day hikes, ultralight backpacking and mountaineering are sometimes frameless as well.

Sports

Sports and hydration backpacks are smaller with a profile closer to the body, wider straps and can come with water bladders and hip belts for running, cycling or hiking. Running hydration packs are the smallest and lightest, many under 2 litres and most under six litres. Compression straps across the top of one's body are common as are hip belts. Cycling hydration packs are six to ten litres sitting high on the back. Although daypacks are small averaging ten to thirty litres, all Trekking and Hiking hydration packs are generally the largest and heaviest. Thirty five up to sixty five litres and above are common.

External frame packs
External frame packs were designed to carry heavy loads (>20 kg or 40 lb), giving the wearer more support and protection and better weight distribution than a simple, frameless strapped bag. Wooden pack frames were used for centuries around the world. Ötzi the Iceman may have used one in Copper Age Alpine Italy, though some archaeologists believe the frame found with the body was part of a snowshoe. Such packs are common in military and mountaineering applications; metal versions first appeared in the mid-20th century.

The external frame is typically made from aluminum, other lightweight metal alloy, and recently reinforced synthetic polymers or plastic and is equipped with a system of straps and tautly-stretched netting which prevents contact between the metal frame and user's back. In addition to comfort, this "stand-off" provides the additional benefit of creating air circulation between the frame and the wearer's back. For this reason, external frame packs are generally considered to be a "cooler load" than internal frame designs. External frame packs have a fabric "sack" portion which is usually smaller than that of internal frame packs, but have exposed frame portions above and below the sack to accommodate attachment of larger items. In addition, the sack can often be removed entirely, permitting the user to customize the configuration of their load, or to transport a non-conventional load such as a quartered game animal. Military packs are often external frame designs due to their ability to carry loads of different shapes, sizes and weights.

A recently proposed type of external frame would be made from composite plastic, which is not flexible like current backpack straps are, and can be shaped like human spine curvature. In this type of backpack, the load would directly transfer to the shoulders through the non-flexible straps, helpful in preventing damage of long term backpack carrying. This non-flexible structure also diminishes the momentum at the lumbar region of the back. The strap curvature would be shaped closely to normal spine curvature, with two flexible drawstrings to minimize backpack movement along the transverse plane. The straps of this backpack would be wide enough to distribute the pressure on the shoulders, with an internal white glass wool layer to absorb dynamic forces from movement. This backpack type is experimental, needing further development before usage.

Internal frame packs
The internal frame backpack is a recent innovation, invented in 1967 by Greg Lowe, who went on to found Lowe Alpine and Lowepro, companies specializing in backpacks and other forms of carrying bags for various equipment. An internal-frame pack has a large fabric section around an internal frame composed of strips of either aluminum, titanium or plastic, sometimes with additional metal stays to reinforce the frame. A complex series of straps works with the frame to distribute the weight and hold it in place. The internal frame permits the pack to fit closely to the wearer's back and minimizes shifting of the load, which is desirable when participating in activities that involve upper-body movement such as scrambling over rocky surfaces and skiing. However, the tight fit reduces ventilation, so these type of packs tend to be more sweaty than external frame packs. The internal construction also allows for a large storage compartment; a few lash points (including webbing loops and straps for sleeping bags and other large items) may be present, but as the frame is completely integrated, it is difficult to securely lash larger and heavier items which do not fit inside the compartment to the outside of the pack. Internal frame packs originally suffered from smaller load capacity and less comfortable fit during steady walking, but newer models have improved greatly in these respects. In addition, because of their snug fit, the improved internal frame models have largely replaced external frame backpacks for many activities.

Daily use

A daypack is a smaller, frameless backpack that can hold enough contents for a day hike, or a day's worth of other activities. They are not large enough for average wilderness backpacking that use full-sized sleeping bags and backpacking tents, but may be large enough for ultralight backpacking. Padded or unpadded waist straps may be provided to distribute weight across the body.

In many countries, backpacks are heavily identified with students, and are a primary means of transporting educational materials to and from school. In this context they are sometimes known as bookbags or schoolbags. The purchase of a suitably fashionable, attractive, and useful backpack is a crucial back-to-school ritual for many students.

Typical school backpacks generally lack the rigid frame of an outdoor-style backpack and include only a few pockets in the front in addition to the main storage compartment. While traditionally very simple in design, school backpacks are often made with padded shoulder straps and backs as well as additional reinforcement to hold large numbers of heavy textbooks, as well as safety features such as reflective panels to make the wearer of the pack more visible at night.

Backpacks are sometimes worn as fashion accessories, in which they perform the same function as a purse. Some such backpacks designed specifically for women are no larger than a typical purse, and are generally associated with younger women.

Special-purpose
Some backpacks are specifically designed to carry certain items. Common examples include backpacks for small valuable items such as laptops and cameras; backpacks designed to hold laptop computers in particular generally have a padded compartment to hold the computer and medium-sized pockets and flaps to accommodate accessories such as charger cables and mice. These are especially common in college and university settings. In order to supply these devices with electricity, a few high-end backpacks are equipped with solar panels.

Rolling backpacks are backpacks with wheels on the bottom and an extending handle. Because of their design, rolling backpacks reduce the strain on the user, though the shoulder straps may be used to carry the pack for short distances when the terrain is not suitable for wheels. Rolling backpacks are most commonly used while traveling by airplane or train.

Hydration backpacks  are also available. These light daypacks are specifically designed to hold water in a special water bladder (also known as reservoir), and their purpose is to allow the carrier constant fluid hydration handsfree, so that the carrier can focus on their task without having to stop to get a water bottle out.

Professional use
Backpacks are a standard part of the load-bearing equipment of soldiers, especially infantry, in most countries, and military-style packs are regularly available to civilians in military surplus stores. Well-known examples include the United States ALICE field pack and the British Army PLCE rucksack attachment, both of which are widely available to civilian markets both as actual military surplus (new or used) and as replicas. Such packs are often, though not always (e.g. the USMC's ILBE pack), external-frame packs, with the pack itself lashed or pinned to a metal or plastic carrying frame. Each soldier may carry extra weapons, ammunition, rations, medical supplies, tents or other shelter material, and extra clothing.

Many police tactical units, as well as players of military-style combat games such as paintball and airsoft, use these military-style tactical backpacks and webbing for storing gear and ammunition. There is also a small but thriving industry devoted to creating historical reproductions of military gear; such companies generally produce period-appropriate uniforms and other gear in addition to backpacks.

Some more recent military/tactical designs, especially the MOLLE and ILBE packs used by the United States armed forces, are covered with webbing loop attachment points for increased carrying capacity.

Recently, at least one brand of backpack has been specially designed for professional cooks and culinary students. This sort of backpack is meant to safely carry knives, cooking tools, and other miscellaneous equipment such as notebooks, towels, and uniforms.

Specialist backpacks are used by fire services for wildfire fighting, as well as by rescue services for Search and Rescue. These backpacks are generally very modular, allowing the pack to be reconfigured to the users wishes and are designed to load around the wearers hips. They may include features such as sections for water bladders and specially designed pouches, such as those used to carry personal fire shelters.

Image gallery

Backpacks for travel

Backpacks are sometimes used as luggage, particularly as carry-on bags for airplane travel.

In addition to their use in outdoors pursuits, backpacks are sometimes used in other sports as well. Hydration packs, sometimes used by athletes and military personnel, carry water (in either a bladder or a rigid bottle) and have a tube connected to them from which the wearer can drink without removing the pack; this feature is also included in some more general-purpose hiking backpacks. Backpacks that carry skateboards have also become more popular in the youth culture.

See also

Backpack palsy
Bindle
Duffel bag
Fanny pack
Hydration pack
Messenger bag
Papoose
Pasiking
Satchel
Shoulder strap

References

External links
 

Bags
Camping equipment
Domestic implements
Hiking equipment
Luggage